David Calder may refer to:

David Calder (rower) (born 1978), Canadian rower and Olympic athlete
David Calder (actor) (born 1946), British actor
David O. Calder (1823–1884), Mormon pioneer and journalist